Serena and Venus Williams defeated Martina Hingis and Anna Kournikova in the final, 6–3, 6–7(2–7), 8–6 to win the women's doubles tennis title at the 1999 French Open. It was the first major title for the Williams sisters, and would be their first step towards completing the career Golden Slam in doubles.

Hingis and Jana Novotná were the defending champions, but they did not compete together this year. Novotná partnered Natasha Zvereva as the first seed, but they retired in their quarterfinal match against Lindsay Davenport and Mary Pierce.

Seeds

Draw

Finals

Top half

Section 1

Section 2

Bottom half

Section 3

Section 4

External links
1999 French Open – Women's draws and results at the International Tennis Federation

Women's Doubles
French Open by year – Women's doubles
1999 in women's tennis
1999 in French women's sport